Mother Courage (German Mutter Courage) is a character from a Grimmelshausen novel Lebensbeschreibung der Ertzbetrügerin und Landstörtzerin Courasche (The Runagate Courage) dating from around 1670. The character had played a cameo role in Der abentheuerliche Simplicissimus in 1669.

The Bertolt Brecht play Mutter Courage und ihre Kinder (Mother Courage and Her Children) gave her currency in the 20th century.  Mother Courage is cast as a walking contradiction by Brecht.  She is torn between protecting her children from the war and making a profit out of the war.

Cúruisce (Courasche) appears in Ireland as a fictional character in Darach Ó Scolaí's Irish language novel An Cléireach. After travelling from Flanders in the company of a junior officer in the Tyrone regiment she serves in 1650 as a camp follower of the regiment of colonel Edmund O'Flaherty in the Royalist army.

References

Sources
Cara M. Horwich (1997), Survival in Simplicissimus and Mutter Courage 
John W. Jacobson, A Defense of Grimmelshausen's Courasche, The German Quarterly, Vol. 41, No. 1 (Jan., 1968), pp. 42–54

Characters in German novels
Characters in plays
Fictional characters introduced in the 1660s
Female characters in literature
Female characters in theatre
Fictional German people